"You and Only You" is a song written by J.D. Martin and Chuck Jones, and recorded by American country music artist John Berry. It was released in October 1994 as the fifth single from the album John Berry.  The song peaked at number 4 on the U.S.Billboard Hot Country Singles & Tracks chart and reached number-one on the Canadian RPM Country Tracks chart.

Music video
The music video was directed by Michael McNamara and premiered in October 1994, and it features Berry performing the song live with his band.

Chart performance
"You and Only You" debuted at number 66 on the U.S. Billboard Hot Country Singles & Tracks for the week of October 15, 1994.

Year-end charts

References

1994 singles
1993 songs
John Berry (country singer) songs
Liberty Records singles
Songs written by Chuck Jones (songwriter)
Songs written by J. D. Martin (songwriter)